Eugene Perry Link, Jr. (born 1944) is Chancellorial Chair Professor for Innovative Teaching Comparative Literature and Foreign Languages in College of Humanities, Arts, and Social Sciences at the University of California, Riverside and Emeritus Professor of East Asian Studies at Princeton University. He specializes in modern Chinese literature and Chinese language. Link is a Harvard University alumnus who received his B.A. in 1966 and his Ph.D. in 1976. Link has been a Board Member of the Committee for Freedom in Hong Kong (CFHK) since 2021. CFHK is a US-based non-profit organisation, which presses for the preservation of freedom, democracy, and international law in Hong Kong.

Tiananmen Papers
Link has translated many Chinese stories, writings and poems into English. Along with Andrew J. Nathan, he translated the Tiananmen Papers, which detailed the governmental response to the 1989 democracy protests. In 1996, China blacklisted Link, and he has been denied entrance ever since. In 2001, Link was detained and questioned upon arriving in Hong Kong because of his involvement in the Tiananmen Papers. After roughly one hour, he was allowed to enter Hong Kong, where he spoke at the Hong Kong Foreign Correspondents Club. He has been banned from the People's Republic of China since, however.

Selected publications

Books
Mandarin Ducks and Butterflies: Popular Fiction in Early Twentieth-Century Chinese Cities (University of California Press, 1981).

Evening Chats in Beijing (W.W. Norton, 1994), The Uses of Literature: Life in the Socialist Chinese Literary System (Princeton University Press, 2000).

Banyang suibi 半洋隨筆 (Notes of a Semi-Foreigner; in Chinese) (Taipei: Sanminchubanshe, 1999).

 An Anatomy of Chinese: Rhythm, Metaphor, Politics (Harvard University Press, 2013).

Translations

Charter 08 manifesto (January 2009).

 Fang Lizhi, The Most Wanted Man In China: My Journey from Scientist to Enemy of the State (Henry Holt, 2015).

Liu Xiaobo, No Enemies, No Hatred: Selected Essays and Poems (Harvard University Press, 2013).

References

Notes

External links

Faculty page at UCR
Biography at Princeton University
Article describing Link's attempted entrance into China
 Article in TIME magazine mentioning Link's detention in Hong Kong

Audio interview with Link on China's Charter '08
Link author page and archive from The New York Review of Books

1944 births
Living people
Harvard University alumni
Princeton University faculty
University of California, Riverside faculty
American sinologists
Chinese–English translators